The Faraday effect or Faraday rotation, sometimes referred to as the magneto-optic Faraday effect (MOFE), is a physical magneto-optical phenomenon. The Faraday effect causes a polarization rotation which is proportional to the projection of the magnetic field along the direction of the light propagation. Formally, it is a special case of gyroelectromagnetism obtained when the dielectric permittivity tensor is diagonal. This effect occurs in most optically transparent dielectric materials (including liquids) under the influence of magnetic fields.

Discovered by Michael Faraday in 1845,  the Faraday effect was the first experimental evidence that light and electromagnetism are related. The theoretical basis of electromagnetic radiation (which includes visible light) was completed by James Clerk Maxwell in the 1860s. Maxwell's equations were rewritten in their current form in the 1870s by Oliver Heaviside.

The Faraday effect is caused by left and right circularly polarized waves propagating at slightly different speeds, a property known as circular birefringence. Since a linear polarization can be decomposed into the superposition of two equal-amplitude circularly polarized components of opposite handedness and different phase, the effect of a relative phase shift, induced by the Faraday effect, is to rotate the orientation of a wave's linear polarization.

The Faraday effect has applications in measuring instruments. For instance, the Faraday effect has been used to measure optical rotatory power and for remote sensing of magnetic fields (such as fiber optic current sensors). The Faraday effect is used in spintronics research to study the polarization of electron spins in semiconductors. Faraday rotators can be used for amplitude modulation of light, and are the basis of optical isolators and optical circulators; such components are required in optical telecommunications and other laser applications.

History

By 1845, it was known through the work of Fresnel, Malus, and others that different materials are able to modify the direction of polarization of light when appropriately oriented, making polarized light a very powerful tool to investigate the properties of transparent materials. Faraday firmly believed that light was an electromagnetic phenomenon, and as such should be affected by electromagnetic forces. He spent considerable effort looking for evidence of electric forces affecting the polarization of light through what are now known as electro-optic effects, starting with decomposing electrolytes. However, his experimental methods were not sensitive enough, and the effect was only measured thirty years later by John Kerr.

Faraday then attempted to look for the effects of magnetic forces on light passing through various substances. After several unsuccessful trials, he happened to test a piece of "heavy" glass, containing equal proportions of silica, boracic acid and lead oxide, that he had made during his earlier work on glass manufacturing. Faraday observed that when a beam of polarized light passed through the glass in the direction of an applied magnetic force, the polarization of light rotated by an angle that was proportional to the strength of the force. He used a Nicol prism to measure the polarization. He was later able to reproduce the effect in several other solids, liquids, and gases by procuring stronger electromagnets.

The discovery is well documented in Faraday's daily notebook. On 13 Sept. 1845, in paragraph #7504, under the rubric Heavy Glass, he wrote:
 

He summarized the results of his experiments on 30 Sept. 1845, in paragraph #7718, famously writing:

Physical interpretation
The linear polarized light that is seen to rotate in the Faraday effect can be seen as consisting of the superposition of a right- and a left- circularly polarized beam (this superposition principle is fundamental in many branches of physics). We can look at the effects of each component (right- or left-polarized) separately, and see what effect this has on the result.

In circularly polarized light the direction of the electric field rotates at the frequency of the light, either clockwise or counter-clockwise. In a material, this electric field causes a force on the charged particles that compose the material (because of their large charge to mass ratio, the electrons are most heavily affected). The motion thus effected will be circular, and circularly moving charges will create their own (magnetic) field in addition to the external magnetic field. There will thus be two different cases: the created field will be parallel to the external field for one (circular) polarization, and in the opposing direction for the other polarization direction – thus the net B field is enhanced in one direction and diminished in the opposite direction. This changes the dynamics of the interaction for each beam and one of the beams will be slowed more than the other, causing a phase difference between the left- and right-polarized beam. When the two beams are added after this phase shift, the result is again a linearly polarized beam, but with a rotation of the polarization vector.

The direction of polarization rotation depends on the properties of the material through which the light is shone. A full treatment would have to take into account the effect of the external and radiation-induced fields on the wave function of the electrons, and then calculate the effect of this change on the refractive index of the material for each polarization, to see whether the right- or left-circular polarization is slowed more.

Mathematical formulation

Formally, the magnetic permeability is treated as a non-diagonal tensor as expressed by the equation:

The relation between the angle of rotation of the polarization and the magnetic field in a transparent material is:

where

β is the angle of rotation (in radians)
B is the magnetic flux density in the direction of propagation (in teslas)
d is the length of the path (in meters) where the light and magnetic field interact
 is the Verdet constant for the material. This empirical proportionality constant (in units of radians per tesla per meter) varies with wavelength and temperature and is tabulated for various materials.

A positive Verdet constant corresponds to L-rotation (anticlockwise) when the direction of propagation is parallel to the magnetic field and to R-rotation (clockwise) when the direction of propagation is anti-parallel. Thus, if a ray of light is passed through a material and reflected back through it, the rotation doubles.

Some materials, such as terbium gallium garnet (TGG) have extremely high Verdet constants (≈  for 632 nm light). By placing a rod of this material in a strong magnetic field, Faraday rotation angles of over 0.78 rad (45°) can be achieved. This allows the construction of Faraday rotators, which are the principal component of Faraday isolators, devices which transmit light in only one direction.  The Faraday effect can, however, be observed and measured in a Terbium-doped glass with Verdet constant as low as (≈  for 632 nm light). Similar isolators are constructed for microwave systems by using ferrite rods in a waveguide with a surrounding magnetic field. A thorough mathematical description can be found here.

Examples

Interstellar medium 
The effect is imposed on light over the course of its propagation from its origin to the Earth, through the interstellar medium. Here, the effect is caused by free electrons and can be characterized as a difference in the refractive index seen by the two circularly polarized propagation modes. Hence, in contrast to the Faraday effect in solids or liquids, interstellar Faraday rotation (β) has a simple dependence on the wavelength of light (λ), namely:

where the overall strength of the effect is characterized by RM, the rotation measure. This in turn depends on the axial component of the interstellar magnetic field B||, and the number density of electrons ne, both of which vary along the propagation path. In Gaussian cgs units the rotation measure is given by:

or in  SI units:

where
ne(s) is the density of electrons at each point s along the path
B‖(s) is the component of the interstellar magnetic field in the direction of propagation at each point s along the path
e is the charge of an electron;
c is the speed of light in vacuum;
m is the mass of an electron;
 is the vacuum permittivity;

The integral is taken over the entire path from the source to the observer.

Faraday rotation is an important tool in astronomy for the measurement of magnetic fields, which can be estimated from rotation measures given a knowledge of the electron number density. In the case of radio pulsars, the dispersion caused by these electrons results in a time delay between pulses received at different wavelengths, which can be measured in terms of the electron column density, or dispersion measure. A measurement of both the dispersion measure and the rotation measure therefore yields the weighted mean of the magnetic field along the line of sight.  The same information can be obtained from objects other than pulsars, if the dispersion measure can be estimated based on reasonable guesses about the propagation path length and typical electron densities. In particular, Faraday rotation measurements of polarized radio signals from extragalactic radio sources occulted by the solar corona can be used to estimate both the electron density distribution and the direction and strength of the magnetic field in the coronal plasma.

The ionosphere 
Radio waves passing through the Earth's ionosphere are likewise subject to the Faraday effect. The ionosphere consists of a plasma containing free electrons which contribute to Faraday rotation according to the above equation, whereas the positive ions are relatively massive and have little influence. In conjunction with the earth's magnetic field, rotation of the polarization of radio waves thus occurs. Since the density of electrons in the ionosphere varies greatly on a daily basis, as well as over the sunspot cycle, the magnitude of the effect varies. However the effect is always proportional to the square of the wavelength, so even at the UHF television frequency of 500 MHz (λ = 60 cm), there can be more than a complete rotation of the axis of polarization.  A consequence is that although most radio transmitting antennas are either vertically or horizontally polarized, the polarization of a medium or short wave signal after reflection by the ionosphere is rather unpredictable. However the Faraday effect due to free electrons diminishes rapidly at higher frequencies (shorter wavelengths) so that at microwave frequencies, used by satellite communications, the transmitted polarization is maintained between the satellite and the ground.

Semiconductors 

Due to spin-orbit coupling, undoped GaAs single crystal exhibits much larger Faraday rotation than glass (SiO2). Considering the atomic arrangement is different along the (100) and (110) plane, one might think the Faraday rotation is polarization dependent. However, experimental work revealed an immeasurable anisotropy in the wavelength range from 880–1,600 nm. Based on the large Faraday rotation, one might be able to use GaAs to calibrate the B field of the terahertz electromagnetic wave which requires very fast response time. Around the band gap, the Faraday effect shows resonance behavior.

More generally, (ferromagnetic) semiconductors return both electro-gyration and a Faraday response in the high frequency domain. The combination of the two is described by gyroelectromagnetic media, for which gyroelectricity and gyromagnetism (Faraday effect) may occur at the same time.

Organic materials 
While the Verdet constant of organic materials does increase around electronic transitions in the molecule, the associated light absorption makes most organic materials bad candidates for applications. There are however also isolated reports of large Faraday rotation in organic liquid crystals without associated absorption.

Plasmonic and magnetic materials 

In 2009  γ-Fe2O3-Au core-shell nanostructures were synthesized to integrate  magnetic (γ-Fe2O3) and plasmonic (Au) properties into one composite. Faraday rotation with and without the plasmonic materials was tested and rotation enhancement under 530 nm light irradiation was observed. Researchers claim that the magnitude of the magneto-optical enhancement is governed primarily by the spectral overlap of the magneto-optical transition and the plasmon resonance.

The reported composite magnetic/plasmonic nanostructure can be visualized to be a magnetic particle embedded in a resonant optical cavity. Because of the large density of photon states in the cavity, the interaction between the electromagnetic field of the light and the electronic transitions of the magnetic material is enhanced, resulting in a larger difference between the velocities of the right- and left-hand circularized polarization, therefore enhancing Faraday rotation.

See also

 Electro-optic Kerr effect
 Faraday rotator
 Inverse Faraday effect
 Magnetic circular dichroism
 Magneto-optic Kerr effect
 Optical rotation
 Polarization spectroscopy
 QMR effect (quadratic rather than linear)
 Voigt effect (magnetic-linear birefringence)

References

External links
 Faraday Rotation (at Eric W. Weisstein's World of Physics)
 Electro-optical measurements (Kerr, Pockels, and Faraday) 
 Faraday Rotation Effect in (radio)astronomy
 A simple 

Magneto-optic effects
Michael Faraday
Polarization (waves)